This article documents the debate over China's economic responsibilities for climate change mitigation and mitigation of climate change in China.

There has been an ongoing debate over China's climate responsibilities, both internationally and within the People's Republic of China. Since 2006, when China surpassed the US as the country with the highest emissions rate for the main atmospheric gas in global warming, carbon dioxide (CO2), this topic has received increasing worldwide attention.

The pros and cons

The experts who argue (as detailed below) that China should be spending more of its resources on mitigation point out China's total emissions, the criticisms it has received from other developing nations and from its citizens, the toll of pollution on China's gross domestic product (GDP), the lack of regulations strong enough to have an effect, the cumbersome delegation of responsibility for pollution problems, and China's refusal to commit to an emissions cap.

Experts who argue (as detailed below) that China should not be spending more assert that China is doing the most possible with its limited resources. To support this argument, they cite its low per capita emissions, the world-class scale of some of its mitigation efforts, its success at keeping emissions growth significantly less than GDP growth, the significant chunk of China's emissions that are created by multinational businesses in China, the opposition from its own provincial and local officials to carrying out the environmental regulations, the short time-length of China's CO2 emissions compared to the 200-year history of the industrialized nations' emissions, and the hypocrisy of criticizing China for attempting to catch up with the West through the same CO2-emitting practices with which the West developed.

The 'pros': China should be spending more of its resources

Highest total emissions

In 2006, China's (including Taiwan) CO2 emissions surpassed those of the US by 8%, according to the Netherlands Environmental Assessment Agency.  Compared to the previous year, China's total emissions increased by 9% (to 6.2 billion tons of CO2), while emissions in the US decreased by 1.4% (to 5.8 billion), compared to the previous year.  China's increasing rate of  emissions is heading toward a 50-100% increase above the current world total for CO2 emissions, by 20 years from now. Scientists warn that if China continues to increase its GDP at a rate of at least 7% per year, it will by then be emitting as much CO2 per year as the whole world emitted in 2007 -- 8 gigatons per year.

Other developing nations are critical
Small island nations see China as among the developed countries in terms of China's responsibility to reduce emissions. This stems from the fact that smaller island nations, and not China, are most immediately at risk from the effects of global warming. They are aware as well that it is the world's poorest nations that will suffer most in the long run.

Internal dissent in China
There is pressure on the Chinese government from within China as well. "Citizen complaints about the environment, expressed on official hotlines and in letters to local officials, were increasing at a rate of 30% a year in 2006," and were projected to top 450,000 in 2007. Since presenting their first joint statement on the Kyoto Protocol in Bali in December 2007, Chinese non-governmental organizations (NGOs), in cooperation with international NGOs, have been assuming a more prominent role in efforts to mitigate climate change within China. NGO activity in China, however, remains restricted by tight government controls.

The toll on GDP
A federal financial auditing project—the 'Green GDP' -- has focused on the economic losses incurred by pollution. The project began in 2004 to incorporate the externalities of previously unaccounted-for environmental costs, but soon produced results that were much worse than anticipated. The program was quietly tabled in 2007.

The fines for violating CO2-mitigating regulations are too low
Firms facing the choice of either paying a given fine for their effluence into community streams, or spending ten times as much on waste treatment, usually opt to pay the fine and continue polluting. Provincial officials themselves complain that the fines are too low to enable them to enforce federal environmental regulations.

Poor delegation of authority
The problem of ineffectual fines is compounded by the cumbersome delegation of authority over -related issues. For instance, while water pollution as a problem is the responsibility of SEPA (China's equivalent of the United States Environmental Protection Agency), the water itself, in its specific functions or locations, comes under the control of three other separate ministries: Ministry of Construction (deals with sewage), Ministry of Land and Resources (controls groundwater), and Ministry of Water Resources (manages water in general).

Indeed, the environmental damage in China is already costing its economy about 10% of its GDP, and is costing that in spite of the millions in venture capital invested in China by foreign firms for mitigation projects under the Clean Development Mechanism.

The 'cons': China should not be spending more of its resources

The large scale of current mitigation

Though China continues to build emissions-intensive coal-fired power plants, its "rate of development of renewable energy is even faster".

There is great interest in solar power in China. The world's market share of China's photovoltaic units manufacturers grew from approximately 1% in 2003 to 18% in 2007, with one of the largest Chinese manufacturers of these devices being the Chinese solar company Suntech.  Although the overwhelming majority of the photovoltaic units are exported, plans are under to increase the installed capacity to at least 1,800 MW by 2020. Some officials expect the plans to be significantly over-fulfilled, with the installed capacity reaching possibly as much as 10,000 megawatts by 2020.

Due to the growing demand for photovoltaic electricity, more companies (Aleo Solar, Global Solar, Anwell, CMC Magnetics, etc.) have entered into the photovoltaic market, which is expected to lower the cost of PV cells.

Solar water heating is already used extensively throughout the country.

China also has embarked upon a 9 million acre (36,000 km2) reforestation project—the Green Wall of China—that may become the largest ecological project in history; it is projected to be finished by 2050 at a cost of $8 billion.  China has five major eco-cities in construction or completed. The capital city has, as well, car regulations more stringent than those in the US.

Keeping emissions growth at less than GDP growth
Considering that energy consumption in most developed countries has usually grown faster than GDP during the early stages of industrialization, it is to China's credit that while its GDP has grown by 9.5% per year over the last 27 years, its  emissions have increased by only about 5.4% per year, meaning that its carbon intensity (its carbon emissions per unit of GDP) has decreased during that time, though it remains the among the highest of any of the developed or developing nations.

Emissions contributed by multinationals in China
Chinese officials claim that they are doing a great deal that is often not visible, especially for a country as large, populous, and (rurally) undeveloped as it is. But working against that, and equally non-visible, is the role of multinational ventures in China in contributing to its emissions. It has been estimated that as of 2004, almost a quarter (23%) of China's  emissions were coming from Chinese-made products destined for the West, providing an interesting perspective on China's large trade surplus. Another study shown that around 1/3 emissions from China in 2005 are due to exports. Over half of those emissions driven by demand from the West are from transnationals taking advantage of China's developmental policies favouring heavy manufacturing over regions with more developed environmental laws and enforcement.  This includes many of the Walmart-suppliers and other foreign-owned factories that stock department store shelves, particularly in the US,.

China points out that it is being punished for having become "the place where the US effectively outsources much of its pollution,"  and has buttressed its call for joint international responsibility for at least part of China's emissions, by making public, in Jan 2008, Multinationals committed 130 violations of Chinese environmental law.

Opposition from provincial and local officials
However, officials in Beijing cite violations by China's own companies as well—in this case, to illustrate the enormity of the task in front of them in getting compliance for environmental regulations which they see as very progressive. Regional and local officials have been taken to task for this.

For example, in 2006, Premier Wen Jiabao issued a warning to local officials to shut down some of the plants in the most energy-intensive industries, designating at least six industries for slow-down. The following year, those same industries posted a 20.6% increase in output.  In 2006 as well, the federal government began banning logging in some locations in order to expand its protection of forests, and at the same time restricted the size of cities and golf courses in order to increase land use efficiency. Yet many of the local officials responsible for carrying out the new regulations essentially ignored them.

Why, one might ask, is a strong central government such as China's not able to control maverick local and regional officials? The problem may have something to do with the fact that China's top environmental agency—the State Environmental Protection Agency (SEPA) has barely 1% the number of employees as the United States Environmental Protection Agency, while attempting to enforce regulations over a similarly sized but much more populated land mass than the US.

Another reason for lack of compliance is apparently because local governments now have a chunk of funding for which they are not beholden to the central government, and are motivated to protect those funding sources which pollute, but pollute profitably.

As a result, SEPA's attempt to use local banks as a means of discouraging companies from carbon-intensive practices has followed a troubled path.  Many local governments that have officially implemented the 'Green Credit' policy of loaning only to companies with green practices continue also to protect polluting firms that are profitable, and the banks in some provinces have yet to apply the policy at all.

China is following the example of developed nations

Given all the above, it is perhaps not surprising that China's leadership turns to the US and international bodies to press for funding and understanding in its struggle to reduce emissions—since "developing countries need room to develop"—and protest that China cannot tackle global warming to the West's satisfaction with its huge population. They worry as well that China would end up suffering a slowdown in economic growth that would result in "massive unemployment and social unrest".
To the Chinese, it appears ironic at best that China is being criticized for following the practice of 'pollute first, clean up later' that the Western nations themselves followed during their early stages of capital accumulation.

China is collaborating with developed nations
According to the Seattle Post-Intelligencer, the United States signed an agreement with Chinese leaders to form the U.S-China Clean Energy Forum, a private-sector process to accelerate cooperation between the two countries. Through this agreement, China is joining forces with the United States to find ways to cut greenhouse gas emissions. As per the Seattle Post Intelligencer, China already has "combined market clout to help reduce the cost premium to adopt clean technologies." A developed country like the United States would help China fund projects.

China's short history of emissions versus the industrialized nations' long history
Chinese officials argue that China has been contributing to global warming for only 30 years, while the developed countries have been doing so for 200 years. And since pollution-flagrant early stages of industrialization may have contributed to what China sees as a lack of balance of power, particularly between the US and China, many Chinese officials see global warming mitigation as creating an economic burden that slows its economy and further exacerbates the unequal balance of power.

Chinese officials point out that the highest per capita emissions have long been and still are in the developed countries, not in China, and that about 77% of the greenhouse gas emissions prior to 2000 were created by the already developed nations. They implied that it is the developed nations who should shoulder a comparable portion of the global cost for reversing the world's emissions, consistent with the polluter pays principle.

China's climate envoy Xie Zhenhua has emphasized China’s stance that rich countries have a greater responsibility regarding climate change than China, though China has been the world’s largest carbon emitter since 2006. His speech at the 2010 climate conference in South Africa conveyed this Chinese position:

The lack of a cap on emissions is shared by many
Finally, the provision by which China signed the Kyoto Protocol without committing to a cap was the same provision given to all developing nation signers.

See also

 Attribution of recent climate change
 Belt and Road Initiative International Green Development Coalition
 Climate change in China
 Dongtan, a Chinese eco-city
 Energy policy of China
 Green growth in China
 List of countries by carbon dioxide emissions

References

Works cited

External links 
 China Takes a New Interest in Energy Efficiency by Keith Bradsher of The New York Times June 15, 2011
 A Green Solution, or the Dark Side to Cleaner Coal? by Keith Bradsher of The New York Times June 14, 2011
 Can China Go Green? No other country is investing so heavily in clean energy. But no other country burns as much coal to fuel its economy, Bill McKibben June 2011 National Geographic (magazine)
  China plots course for green growth amid a boom built on dirty industry; National economic blueprint set to tackle pollution and waste, and invest in renewable energy 4.February.2011
 China Pushes Clean-Energy Agenda Ahead of Summit November 22, 2011

Climate change in China
Climate change policy
Environmental issues in China
Climate change assessment and attribution
Controversies in China
Climate change controversies